Kylix hecuba is a species of sea snail, a marine gastropod mollusk in the family Drilliidae.

Description
The shell grows to a length of 11 mm, its diameter 4.5 mm.

(Original description) The small, acute, rosaceous, solid shell contains six whorls, excluding the (damaged) protoconch. It differs from Cymatosyrinx idothea Dall, 1919 by its more slender shell, wider fasciole, over which the ends of the ribs reach the preceding suture, forming a more pronounced shoulder at the periphery, and having the whole shell spirally sculptured by small equal threads with subequal interspaces. The columella is longer and the siphonal canal distinct, longer, and somewhat constricted. Otherwise the shells are very similar and the protoconch, though damaged, appears to have been of the same character.

Distribution
This species occurs in the demersal zone of the Pacific Ocean from the Gulf of California, Western Mexico to Panama

References

  Tucker, J.K. 2004 Catalog of recent and fossil turrids (Mollusca: Gastropoda). Zootaxa 682:1–1295

External links
 

hecuba
Gastropods described in 1919